The 1973–74 Capital Bullets season was the team's first in Washington, D.C. area, southeast from nearby Baltimore. Prior to the 1973–74 season, the Baltimore Bullets relocated to Landover, Maryland, a suburb east of Washington, and became the Capital Bullets.

The Bullets finished with a 47–35 record and won the Central Division. Wes Unseld was limited to 56 games due to injuries. In the playoffs, the Bullets fell to the New York Knicks for the fifth time in six years, eliminated in seven games.  Following the season, the team was renamed as the Washington Bullets.

The new Capital Centre opened on December 2, 1973; the Bullets played their earlier home games this season at Cole Field House at the University of Maryland in College Park. They played several home games at Cole during their last seasons in Baltimore.

Draft picks

Roster

Regular season

Season standings

Record vs. opponents

Game log

Preseason

Regular season

|- align="center" bgcolor="#ffcccc"
| 1
| October 9, 19738:05p.m. EDT
| @ Atlanta
| L 114–128
| Riordan (26)
| Hayes (12)
| Chenier (4)
| The Omni7,503
| 0–1
|- align="center" bgcolor="#ffcccc"
| 2
| October 12, 197311:00p.m. EDT
| @ Seattle
| L 102–103
| Hayes (27)
| Stallworth (10)
| Porter (12)
| Seattle Center Coliseum11,673
| 0–2
|- align="center" bgcolor="#ffcccc"
| 3
| October 13, 197311:00p.m. EDT
| @ Portland
| L 87–132
| Chenier (21)
| Hayes (14)
| Hayes,Porter (5)
| Memorial Coliseum9,502
| 0–3
|- align="center" bgcolor="#ffcccc"
| 4
| October 19, 19738:30p.m. EDT
| @ Chicago
| L 103–117
| Chenier (36)
| Hayes (14)
| Riordan (6)
| Chicago Stadium3,000
| 0–4
|- align="center" bgcolor="#ccffcc"
| 5
| October 20, 19738:05p.m. EDT
| Boston
| W 96–87
| Chenier (26)
| Hayes (23)
| Porter (12)
| Cole Field House7,711
| 1–4
|- align="center" bgcolor="#ffcccc"
| 6
| October 21, 19737:35p.m. EDT
| Chicago
| L 99–107
| Chenier (25)
| Hayes (19)
| Chenier (6)
| Cole Field House7,641
| 1–5
|- align="center" bgcolor="#ccffcc"
| 7
| October 23, 19738:00p.m. EDT
| @ New York
| W 101–84
| Porter (27)
| Hayes,Leaks (18)
| Porter (5)
| Madison Square Garden18,722
| 2–5
|- align="center" bgcolor="#ccffcc"
| 8
| October 28, 19737:35p.m. EST
| Philadelphia
| W 119–99
| Chenier (32)
| Hayes (23)
| Porter (7)
| Cole Field House5,620
| 3–5

|- align="center" bgcolor="#ccffcc"
| 9
| November 3, 19732:40p.m. EST
| @ Philadelphia
| W 112–84
| Hayes (34)
| Hayes (20)
| Chenier (5)
| The Spectrum5,112
| 4–5
|- align="center" bgcolor="#ccffcc"
| 10
| November 4, 19737:35p.m. EST
| Phoenix
| W 102–99
| Chenier,Riordan (25)
| Hayes (19)
| Porter (9)
| Cole Field House5,316
| 5–5
|- align="center" bgcolor="#ccffcc"
| 11
| November 7, 19739:00p.m. EST
| @ Houston
| W 111–97
| Riordan (29)
| Hayes (23)
| Porter (13)
| Hofheinz Pavilion2,758
| 6–5
|- align="center" bgcolor="#ccffcc"
| 12
| November 9, 19738:35p.m. EST
| @ Kansas City-Omaha
| W 109–96
| Riordan (29)
| Hayes (15)
| Porter (11)
| Omaha Civic Auditorium4,182
| 6–6
|- align="center" bgcolor="#ffcccc"
| 13
| November 11, 19737:35p.m. EST
| Milwaukee
| L 91–110
| Hayes (26)
| Hayes (16)
| Porter (5)
| Cole Field House11,638
| 7–6
|- align="center" bgcolor="#ccffcc"
| 14
| November 17, 19738:05p.m. EST
| @ Atlanta
| W 115–109
| Hayes (43)
| Hayes (32)
| Clark (9)
| The Omni9,229
| 8–6
|- align="center" bgcolor="#ffcccc"
| 15
| November 18, 19737:35p.m. EST
| Buffalo
| L 101–112
| Porter (23)
| Hayes (20)
| Riordan (6)
| Cole Field House6,134
| 8–7
|- align="center" bgcolor="#ffcccc"
| 16
| November 21, 19738:05p.m. EST
| Los Angeles
| L 97–106
| Chenier (30)
| Hayes (25)
| Porter (8)
| Cole Field House8,841
| 8–8
|- align="center" bgcolor="#ccffcc"
| 17
| November 23, 19738:05p.m. EST
| Atlanta
| W 101–86
| Chenier,Hayes (20)
| Hayes (18)
| Clark,Porter (6)
| Cole Field House9,046
| 9–8
|- align="center" bgcolor="#ccffcc"
| 18
| November 25, 19737:35p.m. EST
| New York
| W 109–81
| Chenier (26)
| Hayes (13)
| Porter (10)
| Cole Field House11,855
| 10–8
|- align="center" bgcolor="#ffcccc"
| 19
| November 28, 19737:30p.m. EST
| @ Boston
| L 104–111
| Hayes (23)
| Hayes (21)
| Chenier,Clark,Porter (6)
| Boston Garden6,810
| 10–9
|- align="center" bgcolor="#ccffcc"
| 20
| November 30, 19738:00p.m. EST
| @ Buffalo
| W 121–113
| Hayes (43)
| Unseld (20)
| Chenier (8)
| Buffalo Memorial Auditorium6,118
| 11–9

|- align="center" bgcolor="#ccffcc"
| 21
| December 2, 19737:35p.m. EST
| Seattle
| W 98–96
| Hayes (36)
| Hayes (29)
| Chenier (5)
| Capital Centre17,500
| 12–9
|- align="center" bgcolor="#ffcccc"
| 22
| December 5, 19739:00p.m. EST
| @ Houston
| L 99–119
| Hayes (23)
| Hayes (14)
| Clark (4)
| Hofheinz Pavilion3,552
| 12–10
|- align="center" bgcolor="#ffcccc"
| 23
| December 7, 19739:00p.m. EST
| @ Phoenix
| L 92–114
| Hayes (23)
| Hayes (10)
| Porter (8)
| Arizona Veterans Memorial Coliseum6,089
| 12–11
|- align="center" bgcolor="#ccffcc"
| 24
| December 9, 197310:00p.m. EST
| @ Los Angeles
| W 110–96
| Hayes (40)
| Hayes (21)
| Riordan (9)
| The Forum12,958
| 13–11
|- align="center" bgcolor="#ccffcc"
| 25
| December 11, 197311:00p.m. EST
| @ Portland
| W 87–82
| Clark (24)
| Hayes (16)
| Clark (7)
| Memorial Coliseum6,818
| 14–11
|- align="center" bgcolor="#ffcccc"
| 26
| December 14, 197311:00p.m. EST
| @ Seattle
| L 88–93
| Hayes (24)
| Hayes (18)
| Clark (7)
| Seattle Center Coliseum11,857
| 14–12
|- align="center" bgcolor="#ccffcc"
| 27
| December 15, 197311:05p.m. EST
| @ Golden State
| W 106–93
| Riordan (33)
| Hayes (22)
| Clark (10)
| Oakland–Alameda County Coliseum Arena6,217
| 15–12
|- align="center" bgcolor="#ffcccc"
| 28
| December 18, 19738:05p.m. EST
| Atlanta
| L 91–98
| Porter (23)
| Hayes (24)
| Clark (8)
| Capital Centre9,135
| 15–13
|- align="center" bgcolor="#ccffcc"
| 29
| December 20, 19738:35p.m. EST
| @ Kansas City-Omaha
| W 98–92
| Chenier (22)
| Hayes (15)
| Clark,Porter,Riordan (4)
| Kansas City Municipal Auditorium4,066
| 16–13
|- align="center" bgcolor="#ccffcc"
| 30
| December 22, 19738:05p.m. EST
| Houston
| W 98–91
| Weatherspoon (19)
| Hayes (20)
| Porter (8)
| Capital Centre7,552
| 17–13
|- align="center" bgcolor="#ccffcc"
| 31
| December 23, 19738:00p.m. EST
| N Buffalo
| W 110–85
| Chenier (27)
| Hayes (21)
| Clark (10)
| Maple Leaf Gardens7,112
| 18–13
|- align="center" bgcolor="#ccffcc"
| 32
| December 25, 19737:30p.m. EST
| @ New York
| W 102–100
| Clark (28)
| Hayes (20)
| Clark (5)
| Madison Square Garden19,694
| 19–13
|- align="center" bgcolor="#ccffcc"
| 33
| December 26, 19738:05p.m. EST
| Chicago
| W 82–81
| Riordan (22)
| Hayes (24)
| Clark (11)
| Capital Centre13,566
| 20–13
|- align="center" bgcolor="#ffcccc"
| 34
| December 28, 19737:35p.m. EST
| @ Detroit
| L 93–102
| Hayes (23)
| Hayes (16)
| Clark (6)
| Cobo Arena6,930
| 20–14
|- align="center" bgcolor="#ffcccc"
| 35
| December 29, 19738:05p.m. EST
| Kansas City-Omaha
| L 102–106
| Chenier,Riordan (23)
| Hayes (25) 
| Clark (6)
| Capital Centre9,140
| 21–14

|- align="center" bgcolor="#ffcccc"
| 36
| January 2, 19748:05p.m. EST
| New York
| L 81–92
| Hayes (23)
| Hayes (16)
| Clark (4)
| Capital Centre17,328
| 20–16
|- align="center" bgcolor="#ccffcc"
| 37
| January 4, 19748:00p.m. EST
| @ Cleveland
| W 94–91
| Hayes (31)
| Hayes (15)
| Porter (7)
| Cleveland Arena3,431
| 21–16
|- align="center" bgcolor="#ccffcc"
| 38
| January 5, 19748:05p.m. EST
| Detroit
| W 93–90
| Chenier (28)
| Unseld (18)
| Unseld (7)
| Capital Centre9,718
| 22–16
|- align="center" bgcolor="#ccffcc"
| 39
| January 6, 19747:35p.m. EST
| Milwaukee
| W 90–88
| Chenier (31)
| Hayes (18)
| Clark (7)
| Capital Centre17,246
| 23–16
|- align="center" bgcolor="#ccffcc"
| 40
| January 8, 19748:05p.m. EST
| Los Angeles
| W 94–92
| Chenier (27)
| Hayes (24)
| Clark,Unseld (5)
| Capital Centre12,048
| 24–16
|- align="center" bgcolor="#ffcccc"
| 41
| January 11, 19749:00p.m. EST
| @ Milwaukee
| L 113–115 (OT)
| Chenier (31)
| Hayes (19)
| Porter (7)
| Milwaukee Arena9,683
| 24–17
|- align="center" bgcolor="#ffcccc"
| 42
| January 12, 19748:05p.m. EST
| Buffalo
| L 96–97
| Chenier (22)
| Leaks (16)
| Riordan (8)
| Capital Centre12,206
| 24–18
|- align="center"
|colspan="9" bgcolor="#bbcaff"|All-Star Break
|- style="background:#cfc;"
|- bgcolor="#bbffbb"
|- align="center" bgcolor="#ccffcc"
| 43
| January 17, 19748:05p.m. EST
| Cleveland
| W 101–86
| Chenier (26)
| Hayes,Unseld (17)
| Clark (8)
| Capital Centre3,217
| 25–18
|- align="center" bgcolor="#ffcccc"
| 44
| January 18, 19748:00p.m. EST
| @ Buffalo
| L 94–98
| Hayes (43)
| Hayes (23)
| Clark,Riordan (4)
| Buffalo Memorial Auditorium11,227
| 25–19
|- align="center" bgcolor="#ccffcc"
| 45
| January 19, 19748:05p.m. EST
| Golden State
| W 117–90
| Porter (22)
| Hayes (17)
| Hayes (6)
| Capital Centre6,112
| 26–19
|- align="center" bgcolor="#ccffcc"
| 46
| January 20, 19747:35p.m. EST
| Houston
| W 111–105
| Riordan (27)
| Hayes,Unseld (21)
| Clark (9)
| Capital Centre8,161
| 27–19
|- align="center" bgcolor="#ffcccc"
| 47
| January 22, 197411:05p.m. EST
| @ Golden State
| L 97–99
| Riordan (27)
| Hayes (21)
| Riordan (5)
| Oakland–Alameda County Coliseum Arena4,023
| 27–20
|- align="center" bgcolor="#ffcccc"
| 48
| January 25, 197411:00p.m. EST
| @ Los Angeles
| L 124–143
| Clark (21)
| Hayes (21)
| Clark (5)
| The Forum14,253
| 27–21
|- align="center" bgcolor="#ffcccc"
| 49
| January 27, 19749:00p.m. EST
| @ Phoenix
| L 107–127
| Chenier (26)
| Hayes (16)
| Clark (7)
| Arizona Veterans Memorial Coliseum5,277
| 27–22
|- align="center" bgcolor="#ffcccc"
| 50
| January 30, 19748:30p.m. EST
| @ Chicago
| L 94–103
| Hayes (26)
| Hayes (18)
| Porter (6)
| Chicago Stadium5,201
| 27–23

|- align="center" bgcolor="#ccffcc"
| 51
| February 1, 19748:00p.m. EST
| @ Cleveland
| W 107–99
| Chenier (38)
| Hayes,Wesley (12)
| Chenier,Porter (7)
| Cleveland Arena3,735
| 28–23
|- align="center" bgcolor="#ccffcc"
| 52
| February 3, 19742:40p.m. EST
| @ Boston
| W 112–99
| Chenier (29)
| Hayes (18)
| Porter (3)
| Boston Garden10,095
| 29–23
|- align="center" bgcolor="#ffcccc"
| 53
| February 5, 19748:05p.m. EST
| @ Atlanta
| L 103–121
| Hayes,Riordan (25)
| Hayes (15)
| Clark,Hayes (5)
| The Omni6,265
| 29–24
|- align="center" bgcolor="#ccffcc"
| 54
| February 6, 19748:05p.m. EST
| Phoenix
| W 109–101
| Hayes (33)
| Hayes (21)
| Porter (12)
| Capital Centre6,738
| 30–24
|- align="center" bgcolor="#ffcccc"
| 55
| February 8, 19749:00p.m. EST
| @ Milwaukee
| L 96–105
| Hayes (21)
| Weatherspoon (18)
| Porter (5)
| Milwaukee Arena10,121
| 30–25
|- align="center" bgcolor="#ccffcc"
| 56
| February 9, 19748:05p.m. EST
| Philadelphia
| W 108–75
| Chenier (20)
| Hayes (22)
| Porter (8)
| Capital Centre7,424
| 31–25
|- align="center" bgcolor="#ffcccc"
| 57
| February 10, 19741:35p.m. EST
| @ Philadelphia
| L 94–95
| Chenier (27)
| Hayes (16)
| Porter (8)
| The Spectrum4,039
| 31–26
|- align="center" bgcolor="#ccffcc"
| 58
| February 12, 19748:00p.m. EST
| @ Cleveland
| W 107–99
| Porter (27)
| Weatherspoon (19)
| Chenier (6)
| Cleveland Arena3,549
| 32–26
|- align="center" bgcolor="#ccffcc"
| 59
| February 13, 19748:05p.m. EST
| Kansas City-Omaha
| W 89–87
| Chenier (30)
| Hayes (16)
| Hayes,Porter (5)
| Capital Centre5,842
| 33–26
|- align="center" bgcolor="#ccffcc"
| 60
| February 16, 19748:05p.m. EST
| Buffalo
| W 101–92
| Porter (27)
| Hayes (21)
| Porter (11)
| Capital Centre12,651
| 34–26
|- align="center" bgcolor="#ccffcc"
| 61
| February 17, 19747:35p.m. EST
| Boston
| W 99–95
| Hayes (27)
| Hayes (20)
| Porter (7)
| Capital Centre17,500
| 35–26
|- align="center" bgcolor="#ccffcc"
| 62
| February 20, 19748:05p.m. EST
| Portland
| W 116–101
| Porter (28)
| Hayes (19)
| Porter (12)
| Capital Centre5,160
| 36–26
|- align="center" bgcolor="#ffcccc"
| 63
| February 22, 19747:35p.m. EST
| @ Detroit
| L 83–84
| Riordan (25)
| Hayes (22)
| Porter (11)
| Cobo Arena9,049
| 36–27
|- align="center" bgcolor="#ffcccc"
| 64
| February 23, 19748:05p.m. EST
| Cleveland
| L 101–104
| Hayes (35)
| Hayes (15)
| Porter (16)
| Capital Centre9,247
| 36–28
|- align="center" bgcolor="#ccffcc"
| 65
| February 24, 19747:35p.m. EST
| Detroit
| W 94–84
| Riordan (22)
| Hayes (21)
| Hayes,Riordan (7)
| Capital Centre14,783
| 37–28
|- align="center" bgcolor="#ffcccc"
| 66
| February 26, 19747:30p.m. EST
| @ New York
| L 71–85
| Porter (17)
| Hayes (17)
| Porter (5)
| Madison Square Garden19,694
| 37–29
|- align="center" bgcolor="#ccffcc"
| 67
| February 27, 19748:05p.m. EST
| Seattle
| W 104–100
| Chenier (25)
| Hayes (27)
| Porter (9)
| Capital Centre5,140
| 38–29

|- align="center" bgcolor="#ffcccc"
| 68
| March 1, 19748:05p.m. EST
| New York
| L 103–112
| Chenier (30)
| Hayes (14)
| Porter (7)
| Capital Centre17,500
| 38–30
|- align="center" bgcolor="#ccffcc"
| 69
| March 3, 19747:35p.m. EST
| Cleveland
| W 98–93
| Hayes (25)
| Hayes (22)
| Porter (7)
| Capital Centre5,072
| 39–30
|- align="center" bgcolor="#ccffcc"
| 70
| March 5, 19748:05p.m. EST
| Atlanta
| W 103–89
| Porter (28)
| Hayes (21)
| Porter (9)
| Capital Centre9,878
| 40–30
|- align="center" bgcolor="#ffcccc"
| 71
| March 6, 19748:05p.m. EST
| @ Philadelphia
| L 99–112
| Chenier (26)
| Hayes (20)
| Porter (6)
| The Spectrum3,229
| 40–31
|- align="center" bgcolor="#ccffcc"
| 72
| March 9, 19748:05p.m. EST
| Portland
| W 106–103
| Chenier (30)
| Hayes (16)
| Porter (9)
| Capital Centre5,116
| 41–31
|- align="center" bgcolor="#ccffcc"
| 73
| March 10, 19742:40p.m. EST
| Golden State
| W 117–107
| Chenier (33)
| Hayes (16)
| Chenier,Clark (6)
| Capital Centre13,986
| 42–31
|- align="center" bgcolor="#ccffcc"
| 74
| March 12, 19748:05p.m. EST
| Philadelphia
| W 112–101
| Chenier (28)
| Unseld (18)
| Porter (7)
| Capital Centre4,970
| 43–31
|- align="center" bgcolor="#ffcccc"
| 75
| March 13, 19749:00p.m. EST
| @ Houston
| L 93–117
| Chenier (19)
| Unseld (10)
| Porter,Unseld (7)
| Hofheinz Pavilion4,153
| 43–32
|- align="center" bgcolor="#ffcccc"
| 76
| March 15, 19749:00p.m. EST
| @ Houston
| L 105–114
| Chenier,Hayes (20)
| Hayes (12)
| Porter (6)
| Hofheinz Pavilion4,653
| 43–33
|- align="center" bgcolor="#ffcccc"
| 77
| March 17, 19748:00p.m. EST
| @ Boston
| L 103–129
| Porter (16)
| Unseld (18)
| Porter (6)
| Boston Garden11,499
| 43–34
|- align="center" bgcolor="#ccffcc"
| 78
| March 20, 19748:05p.m. EST
| Cleveland
| W 101–91
| Hayes (34)
| Hayes (16)
| Unseld (7)
| Capital Centre7,943
| 44–34
|- align="center" bgcolor="#ccffcc"
| 79
| March 22, 19748:05p.m. EST
| Houston
| W 109–95
| Hayes (31)
| Hayes,Unseld (15)
| Clark (10)
| Capital Centre10,306
| 45–34
|- align="center" bgcolor="#ffcccc"
| 80
| March 23, 19748:05p.m. EST
| @ Atlanta
| L 108–119 (OT)
| Riordan (26)
| Hayes (12)
| Clark (7)
| The Omni8,113
| 45–35
|- align="center" bgcolor="#ccffcc"
| 81
| March 24, 19743:00p.m. EST
| Atlanta
| W 120–92
| Porter (26)
| Hayes (16)
| Porter,Unseld (5)
| Capital Centre11,766
| 46–35
|- align="center" bgcolor="#ccffcc"
| 82
| March 26, 19748:05p.m. EST
| Boston
| W 126–108
| Hayes (33)
| Hayes,Unseld (17)
| Porter (9)
| Capital Centre11,449
| 47–35

Player stats
Note: GP=Games played; MP=Minutes Played; FG=Field Goals; FGA=Field Goal Attempts; FG%=Field Goal Percentage; FT=Free Throws; FTA=Free Throws Attempts; FT%=Free Throw Percentage; ORB=Offensive Rebounds; DRB=Defensive Rebounds; TRB=Total Rebounds; AST=Assists; STL=Steals; BLK=Blocks; PF=Personal Fouls; PTS=Points; AVG=Average

Team Stats
Note: G=Games; MP=Minutes Played; FG=Field Goals; FGA=Field Goal Attempts; FG%=Field Goal Percentage; FT=Free Throws; FTA=Free Throw Attempts; FT%=Free Throw Percentage; ORB=Offensive Rebounds; DRB=Defensive Rebounds; TRB=Total Rebounds; AST=Assists; STL=Steals; BLK=Blocks; TOV=Turnovers; PF=Personal Fouls; PTS=Points

Playoffs

|- align="center" bgcolor="#ffcccc"
| 1
| March 29, 19748:30p.m. EST
| @ New York
| L 91–102
| Hayes (40)
| Hayes (14)
| Hayes,Porter (4)
| Madison Square Garden19,694
| 0–1
|- align="center" bgcolor="#ccffcc"
| 2
| March 31, 19742:30p.m. EST
| New York
| W 99–87
| Chenier (35)
| Hayes (21)
| Porter (7)
| Capital Centre16,522
| 1–1
|- align="center" bgcolor="#ccffcc"
| 3
| April 2, 19748:30p.m. EST
| @ New York
| W 88–79
| Porter (22)
| Hayes (13)
| Porter (5)
| Madison Square Garden19,694
| 2–1
|- align="center" bgcolor="#ffcccc"
| 4
| April 5, 19749:05p.m. EST
| New York
| L 93–101 (OT)
| Hayes,Porter (20)
| Hayes (17)
| Porter (7)
| Capital Centre19,035
| 2–2
|- align="center" bgcolor="#ffcccc"
| 5
| April 7, 19741:00p.m. EST
| @ New York
| L 105–106
| Hayes (27)
| Unseld (12)
| Unseld (8)
| Madison Square Garden19,694
| 2–3
|- align="center" bgcolor="#ccffcc"
| 6
| April 10, 19749:05p.m. EST
| New York
| W 109–92
| Hayes (31)
| Hayes (23)
| Unseld (5)
| Capital Centre19,025
| 3–3
|- align="center" bgcolor="#ffcccc"
| 7
| April 12, 19749:00p.m. EST
| @ New York
| L 81–91
| Chenier (21)
| Chenier (14)
| Hayes (5)
| Madison Square Garden19,694
| 3–4
|-

Playoffs player stats
Note: GP=Games played; MP=Minutes Played; FG=Field Goals; FGA=Field Goal Attempts; FG%=Field Goal Percentage; FT=Free Throws; FTA=Free Throw Attempts; FT%=Free Throw Percentage; ORB=Offensive Rebounds; DRB=Defensive Rebounds; TRB=Total Rebounds; AST=Assists; STL=Steals; BLK=Blocks; PF=Personal Fouls; PTS=Points; AVG=Average

Awards and honors
 Elvin Hayes, All-NBA Second Team
 Nick Weatherspoon, NBA All-Rookie Team 1st Team

References

 on Basketball Reference

Washington Wizards seasons
Capital
Wash
Wash